Littles is an unincorporated community in Patoka Township, Pike County, in the U.S. state of Indiana. A post office was established there in 1890, and remained in operation until 1929. The town was named after a coal mine proprietor with the surname Little.

References

Unincorporated communities in Pike County, Indiana
Unincorporated communities in Indiana